Kanishka de Silva Raffel (born 6 November 1964) is a British-born Australian Anglican bishop of Sri Lankan descent, who has served as the Anglican Archbishop of Sydney since 28 May 2021. He previously served as the 12th Dean of St Andrew's Cathedral, Sydney from 4 February 2016 until his installation as archbishop.

Early life and education
Raffel was born on 6 November 1964 in London, England, to Sri Lankan parents, father, Lorenz a tea plantation supervisor and mother, Lilamani, a doctor. They moved to Canada for a brief period but found it too cold and emigrated to Australia in 1972.

Raised a Buddhist, a friend, Andrew Shead, gave him a copy of the Gospel of John when in his third year of his arts-law degree at university. At the age of 21, Raffel was convinced by the words of Jesus in John's Gospel: "No one can come to me unless the Father who sent me draws them, and I will raise them up at the last day" (John 6:44).

Raffel graduated from the University of Sydney with English honours in 1986 and Law (in 1989), and practised law for a number of years. He then trained at Moore Theological College, graduating with a Bachelor of Divinity (BD) and Diploma of Ministry in 1996.

Ordained ministry
Raffel was ordained deacon in 1996 in the Anglican Diocese of Sydney, and priest in 1996 in the Anglican Diocese of Canberra and Goulburn. He served at St Matthew's Church, Wanniassa from 1996 to 1999, and then moved to the Anglican Diocese of Perth where he served for 16 years (1999-2016) as rector of St Matthew's Church, Shenton Park. He obtained a Master of Arts in Theology from Moore Theological College in 2010.

Dean of Sydney
Raffel was appointed Dean of St Andrew's Cathedral in 2016 and installed in that position on 4 February 2016. He was the first person from a non-European background to hold the position.

As dean, Raffel was an active spokesman for Christianity, appearing on ABC radio and on ABC TV's The Drum. In 2021 he led the Sydney diocese's service commemorating the death of Prince Philip, Duke of Edinburgh.

Archbishop of Sydney
As early as 2019, the Sydney Morning Herald had described Raffel as one of the "leading contenders" for the position of Anglican Archbishop of Sydney. In 2021, he was announced as one of four nominees to replace Glenn Davies. On 6 May 2021, he was elected to the position, at a special election synod. 

On 28 May 2021, Raffel was consecrated a bishop by Geoffrey Smith, and installed as archbishop in Sydney's St Andrew's Cathedral. He is the first person from a non-European background to hold the diocesan bishop's position.

Other roles
Raffel holds a number of other roles, including:
 Member of the General Synod Standing Committee.
 Board Member of GAFCON Australia.
 Council Member of The Gospel Coalition Australia.
 Trustee of the Anglican Relief and Development Fund.
 Trustee of Trinity Theological College, Perth.

Personal life
Raffel is married to Cailey, and has two daughters.

References

Living people
Deans of Sydney
Anglican clergy from London
Australian people of Sri Lankan descent
University of Sydney alumni
Moore Theological College alumni
Converts to Anglicanism from Buddhism
Converts to Protestantism from Buddhism
British emigrants to Australia
Sydney Law School alumni
21st-century Anglican archbishops
Anglican archbishops of Sydney
Evangelical Anglican bishops
1964 births